The 1923 Rutgers Queensmen football team represented Rutgers University as an independent during the 1923 college football season. In their 11th season under head coach George Sanford, the Queensmen compiled a 7–1–1 record and outscored their opponents, 260 to 36. The team shut out six of nine opponents, including victories over Villanova (44–0), Richmond (56–0), Boston University (61–0), and Fordham (42–0), but lost to West Virginia (7–27). At the end of the 1923 season, coach Sanford surprised the football world by retiring from the game at age 53. He was inducted into the College Football Hall of Fame in 1971.

Schedule

References

Rutgers
Rutgers Scarlet Knights football seasons
Rutgers Queensmen football